The 2021 Shore Lunch 150 was the 11th stock car race of the 2021 ARCA Menards Series season, the sixth race of the 2021 ARCA Menards Series East season, the fifth race of the 2021 Sioux Chief Showdown season, and the 15th iteration of the event. The race was held on Saturday, July 24, in Newton, Iowa at Iowa Speedway, a 7⁄8 mile (1.4 km) permanent D-shaped oval racetrack. The race would take the scheduled 150 laps to complete. At race's end, Ty Gibbs of Joe Gibbs Racing would dominate the race and win his 14th career ARCA Menards Series win and his sixth of the season. To fill out the podium, Daniel Dye of GMS Racing and Taylor Gray of David Gilliland Racing would finish second and third, respectively.

Background 
Iowa Speedway is a 7/8-mile (1.4 km) paved oval motor racing track in Newton, Iowa, United States, approximately 30 miles (48 km) east of Des Moines. The track was designed with influence from Rusty Wallace and patterned after Richmond Raceway, a short track where Wallace was very successful. It has over 25,000 permanent seats as well as a unique multi-tiered Recreational Vehicle viewing area along the backstretch.

Entry list 

*Withdrew.

Practice

First and final practice 
The only 45-minute practice session would occur on Saturday, July 24, at 4:15 PM CST.

Qualifying 
Qualifying would take place on Saturday, July 24, at 6:00 PM CST. Drivers would all have two laps to set a time- the fastest of the two would be counted.

No drivers would fail to qualify.

Full qualifying results

Race results

References 

2021 ARCA Menards Series
2021 ARCA Menards Series East
NASCAR races at Iowa Speedway
Shore Lunch 150
Shore Lunch 150